Maurilio Mariani (born 22 April 1973) is a retired Italian pole vaulter.

Biography
He won the gold medal at the 1999 Military World Games with 5.70 metres, equalling the championship record set by Jean Galfione. He became Italian champion in 1999, 2000 and 2004. and Italian indoor champion in 1996, 2000 and 2003. He also competed at the 1999 World Championships and the 2000 European Indoor Championships without reaching the final.

His personal best jump was 5.70 metres, achieved three times in 1999, he has 6 caps in national team from 1996 to 2000.

National titles
Maurilio Mariani has won 6 times the individual national championship.
3 wins in pole vault (1999, 2000, 2004)
3 wins in pole vault indoor (1996, 1999, 2003)

See also
 Italian all-time top lists - Pole vault

References

External links
 

1973 births
Living people
Italian male pole vaulters
World Athletics Championships athletes for Italy
Athletics competitors of Centro Sportivo Carabinieri